Alexander Canterell Johnson (born February 8, 1983) is a former American professional basketball player who played two seasons in the National Basketball Association (NBA). He played the power forward position. Johnson played college basketball for Florida State before being selected 45th overall in the 2006 NBA draft by the Indiana Pacers. In the NBA, he played for the Memphis Grizzlies and Miami Heat.

High school/College
Johnson attended Dougherty Comprehensive High School in Albany, Georgia and played collegiately at Florida State for three seasons. A tough, athletic inside player with a  vertical leap, he averaged 13.2 points, 7.4 rebounds and 1.0 block per game for the Seminoles during the 2005–06 season, his last.

NBA career
Johnson was selected by the Indiana Pacers 45th overall in the 2006 NBA Draft, after declaring for the draft in his junior season. His draft rights were traded to the Portland Trail Blazers and subsequently the Memphis Grizzlies on draft day. He played in 59 games during the 2006–07 season for the Grizzlies, averaging 4.4 points and 3.1 rebounds per game.

On August 24, 2007, Johnson signed with the Miami Heat and appeared in 43 games (six starts) for Miami during the campaign, averaging 4.2 points and 2.2 rebounds, in 12.8 minutes per game.

On June 23, 2008, the Miami Heat announced that they had requested waivers on Johnson. Two months later, he signed with Brose Baskets of Bamberg, Germany.

Johnson later played for the Sioux Falls Skyforce of the NBA D-League.

CBA career
In 2012, he signed with the Liaoning Hengye Jaguars of China. In the team's second game of the 2012–13 CBA season, Johnson tallied a double-double by scoring 23 points and grabbing 11 rebounds. He continued his form by tallying another double-double (21 points, 10 rebounds) in a road loss to the Shandong Lions.

NBA career statistics

Regular season

|-
| align="left" | 
| align="left" | Memphis
| 59 || 19 || 12.8 || .538 || .000 || .661 || 3.1 || .3 || .4 || .6 || 4.4
|-
| align="left" | 
| align="left" | Miami
| 43 || 6 || 12.8 || .488 || .000 || .687 || 2.2 || .3 || .3 || .2 || 4.2
|-
|- class="sortbottom"
| style="text-align:center;" colspan="2"| Career
| 102 || 25 || 12.8 || .517 || .000 || .672 || 2.7 || .3 || .4 || .4 || 4.3

Notes

External links

2006 NBA Draft profile
Florida State profile

1983 births
Living people
American expatriate basketball people in China
American expatriate basketball people in Germany
American expatriate basketball people in South Korea
American men's basketball players
Basketball players from Georgia (U.S. state)
Brose Bamberg players
Florida State Seminoles men's basketball players
Indiana Pacers draft picks
Liaoning Flying Leopards players
Memphis Grizzlies players
Miami Heat players
Parade High School All-Americans (boys' basketball)
Power forwards (basketball)
Seoul SK Knights players
Shanxi Loongs players
Shenzhen Leopards players
Sioux Falls Skyforce players
Sportspeople from Albany, Georgia